The Women's individual pursuit (B&VI 1–3) event at the 2008 Summer Paralympics took place on September 9 at the Laoshan Velodrome.

Preliminaries 
Q = Qualifier
WR = World Record

Finals 
Gold medal match

Bronze medal match

References 

Women's individual pursuit (BandVI 1-3)
2008 in women's track cycling